Exit Wounds is a 2001 American vigilante martial arts action thriller film directed by Andrzej Bartkowiak, and starring Steven Seagal and DMX. The film is based on the book of the same name by John Westermann. The book takes place on Long Island, while the film is set in Detroit. Steven Seagal plays Orin Boyd, a police detective notorious for pushing the limits of the law in his quest for justice.

It is the second of three films directed by Andrzej Bartkowiak and produced by Joel Silver that focus on martial arts based action in an urban setting with a hip-hop soundtrack and featuring many of the same cast. The film received mixed reviews from critics. It earned $19 million in its opening weekend, and went on to gross a worldwide total of $79.9 million against a budget of $33 million. Exit Wounds was the final film under Steven Seagal's exclusive contract with Warner Bros.

Plot

Detroit Police Department's detective Orin Boyd (Steven Seagal) is a cop in Detroit's 21st precinct, who saves the Vice President of the United States (Christopher Lawford) from a right-wing Michigan militant group trying to kill him. As Boyd saved the Vice President's life via disobeying orders and killing all the militants, captain Frank Daniels (Bruce McGill) transfers Boyd to the 15th precinct — Detroit's worst precinct.

Boyd's new captain, former internal affairs officer Annette Mulcahy (Jill Hennessy), knows of his reputation, and she tells him that she will not tolerate it. Annette sends Boyd to an anger management class where he meets Henry Wayne (Tom Arnold), the high-strung host of a local talk show called Detroit AM. Boyd comes across local drug dealer Latrell Walker (Earl "DMX" Simmons) and his fast-talking sidekick T.K. Johnson (Anthony Anderson) doing a shady deal with a man named Matt Montini (David Vadim). After a brief fight, Boyd discovers that Montini has been working undercover trying to nail Walker and Boyd ruined the sting, and that does not sit well with Montini's musclebound partner Useldinger (Matthew G. Taylor).

Sergeant Lewis Strutt (Michael Jai White) steps in to cool things down when Boyd gets in a fight with Useldinger. After Boyd stumbles upon the theft of $5,000,000 worth of heroin from evidence storage, Boyd and new partner George Clark (Isaiah Washington) begin focusing their efforts on Walker and T.K. Intrigued by what little they have on Walker, they investigate why he has been visiting Shaun Rollins (Mel Jason "Drag-On" Smalls). Henry discovers is that Walker is not a drug dealer. Walker is a computer expert and billionaire whose real name is Leon Rollins — he is Shaun Rollins' brother. Boyd confronts Leon, who explains that a group of corrupt cops needed a fall guy for a deal gone bad and pinned it on Shaun. It is further revealed that Strutt is the leader of the group, which also includes Montini and Useldinger. Leon and his friend Trish (Eva Mendes) have been videotaping the activities of Strutt's gang, hoping that it might help prove Shaun's innocence and get him out of jail.

Boyd meets Mulcahy at a parking lot and to inform her what he has uncovered. Montini, Useldinger, and some other men try to kill Boyd and Annette. Mulcahy is killed in the chase and Boyd escapes. Boyd calls Frank and tells him that Strutt will be having a meeting at a warehouse in about an hour, to sell the heroin that was stolen. Strutt plans to try to sell it to Leon and T. K., not knowing that Leon is working against him. Frank promises that he will be there with some backup.

Boyd and Daniels show up, but Strutt tells Frank to keep Boyd under control. Boyd realizes that it is Frank who is behind everything. Clark blows open the door and barges in with backup, including police chief Hinges (Bill Duke). Useldinger shoots Boyd and as he is about to shoot him again, George shoots Useldinger dead. Chief Hinges kills Frank by shooting him four times with a shotgun. After a fight with Boyd, Strutt grabs a case full of money and runs up to the roof, where a helicopter is waiting. Montini gets the upper hand in his fight with Leon after he damages Leon's vision with indigo fabric dye. Leon manages to stab Montini in the leg with a piece of broken glass, before killing him by having his neck impaled on a clothes rack. As the helicopter ladder is dragging Boyd across the roof with Strutt hanging on to the ladder, Boyd hooks the ladder to the roof; Strutt falls and is impaled on a metal pipe.

At dawn, Leon gives Hinges the videotape that proves the corruption, hoping that the tape will help prove Shaun's innocence. Hinges does not believe the courts will care about the tape, so Hinges had Shaun released from county jail about an hour before. Boyd decides to stay with the 15th precinct with George as his partner, and T.K. becomes Henry's television co-host.

Cast

Production
The film is based on the book of the same name by John Westermann. The book is set in Long Island, New York, but the film moves the setting to Detroit. Steven Seagal plays Orin Boyd, a police detective notorious for pushing the limits of the law in his quest for justice.

Seagal signed on to the film under a pay-or-play deal.

Filming took place in Toronto, Ontario; Hamilton, Ontario and the Centre Street Bridge in Calgary, Alberta, Canada.
The club scene inside was filmed at Guvernment nightclub in Toronto. The exterior of the club was outside of Tonic nightclub in Toronto.

The film reunites actors DMX, Isaiah Washington, and Anthony Anderson with Polish film director Andrzej Bartkowiak, with whom they first worked together on the earlier 2000 film Romeo Must Die. It is the second of three films directed by Andrzej Bartkowiak and produced by Joel Silver that focus on martial arts based action in an urban setting with a hip-hop soundtrack and featuring many of the same cast. Two years later they collaborated again on the film Cradle 2 the Grave.

Accident on set
Stuntman Chris Lamon died of head injuries on August 23, 2000, six days after a stunt went wrong on the Exit Wounds set in Hamilton, Ontario. A van was being towed along a street upside-down as part of a chase scene; he was supposed to roll safely out, but apparently struck his head. Another stuntman suffered a concussion in the same incident.

Music

A soundtrack containing hip hop music was released on March 20, 2001 by Virgin Records. It peaked at No. 8 on the Billboard 200 and #5 on the Top R&B/Hip-Hop Albums.

Reception

Box office
Exit Wounds debuted at number one at the box office, grossing $19 million at North American theaters from Friday through Sunday. It was considered a surprise hit movie, as it grossed over $50 million in America and almost $30 million throughout the rest of the world. It was hailed as Seagal's big "comeback".

Critical response
On Rotten Tomatoes it has an approval rating of 32% based on 65 reviews. The site's critical consensus states: "It probably goes without saying that Exit Wounds is loaded with plotholes and bad dialogue." On Metacritic the film has a score of 39 out of 100 based on 9 reviews, indicating "generally unfavorable reviews". Audiences polled by CinemaScore gave the film an average grade of "A−" on an A+ to F scale.

Lawrence Van Gelder of The New York Times gave the film 3 out of 5 and wrote: "For those in search of action-filled escapist entertainment who are willing to jettison expectations of credibility into the nearest popcorn tub, Exit Wounds ... will do to pass time on an inclement day." Entertainment Weekly's Owen Gleiberman wrote: "In its low grade way, this blithely brutal cops and drugs thriller is an efficient hot wire entertainment." Gleiberman singled out Jill Hennessy for praise saying she "takes the  minor character of Seagal's precinct commander and invests her with an intelligence and a flirty warm panache that sparkles on screen."

Todd McCarthy of Variety magazine gave the film a negative review, particularly Seagal's performance saying he "makes one wonder how he ever managed to be regarded as anything resembling a movie star." McCarthy complained that the action scenes were "routine and unimaginative" lacking the flair director Bartkowiak had shown in Romeo Must Die. McCarthy was also critical of unconvincing use of easily recognizable Toronto locations as a stand in for Detroit.
Jonathan Foreman of the New York Post suggests that Barkowiak was trying to make a John Woo movie but simply did not have the skills. Foreman called the screenplay "embarrassingly clunky and inane". He concludes "It's hard to know which is more offensive, "Exit Wounds'" ineptitude or its disgusting, cynical brutality. But the people responsible for it are crass and shameless."

References

External links
 
 
 
 

2001 films
2001 action comedy films
2000s crime action films
2000s English-language films
2000s police comedy films
2000s police procedural films
American action comedy films
American crime action films
American police detective films
Fictional portrayals of the Detroit Police Department
Films about terrorism in the United States
Films based on American crime novels
Films directed by Andrzej Bartkowiak
Films produced by Joel Silver
Films scored by Jeff Rona
Films set in Detroit
Films shot in Calgary
Films shot in Hamilton, Ontario
Films shot in Toronto
Silver Pictures films
Village Roadshow Pictures films
Warner Bros. films
2000s American films